Divisional Intermedia was an Uruguayan football league, established in 1915 as the second division of the country's league system to replace Segunda División (folded the previous year). Running from 1915 to 1971, Intermedia was the second division from 1915 to 1941, and then became the third level when professional Uruguayan Segunda División was established in 1942.

The most winning teams of the division were Colón, Mar de Fondo, Progreso, and Uruguay Montevideo with 4 titles each.

History 
The first second division established in Uruguay, the Segunda División had been held since 1903, although it was contested irregularly. When it folded in 1915, the "Divisional Intermedia" replaced it as the second division. Unlike its predecessor, Intermedia was linked to the Primera División, with champions promoting to that division in a promotion and relegation regular system between both leagues.

In 1932, football became professional in Uruguay so Primera División and Intermedia (which still remained amateur) lost their connection. Nevertheless, in 1937, when some lower division clubs acceded to professionalism, a playoff match was played between team placed last in Primera and the champion of Intermedia to decide what clubs would be promoted and/or relegated. This system lasted until 1942, when a professional Uruguayan Segunda División was created and the traditional promotion and relegation system was reinstated.

Divisional Intermedia lasted until 1971 when it was merged with "Divisional Extra" to form "Primera C" (currently, Segunda División Amateur), the third division on pyramid.

List of champions 
Complete list of champions, with missing information of runner ups and 3rd. positions of each season. From 1942–71, Intermedia was the 3rd. division of Uruguay.

Notes

Titles by club

See also
 Uruguayan Segunda División (1903-1914)
 Uruguayan Segunda División

References 

Football leagues in Uruguay
1915 establishments in Uruguay
1941 disestablishments
Sports leagues established in 1915